Val Britton (born 1977 in Livingston, New Jersey) is an American artist, best known for her works on paper and installations. She creates abstract collage works using paper and other mixed media that reference the language of maps, network diagrams and astronomical photography. She lived in the San Francisco Bay Area for 14 years, and as of 2018, she lives in Seattle, Washington.

Biography
Val Britton was born in 1977 in Livingston, New Jersey, her father was a long haul truck driver. She has said in interviews, when she was young her father died and that has influenced the visual language of her work.

She received her B.F.A. in Printmaking in 1999 from Rhode Island School of Design (RISD) in Providence, Rhode Island. After RISD she moved to Brooklyn, and in 2004 she moved to San Francisco to attend graduate school. Britton received her M.F.A. from California College of the Arts (CCA) in 2006.

In 2010, Britton served at the Artist in Residence Program at Recology San Francisco and produced an exhibition called Index to Selected Stars. Index to Selected Stars featured collage work made with various types of tape, inks and various types of found paper.

In 2014, Gallery Wendi Norris in San Francisco presented Val Britton's first San Francisco gallery solo show entitled Passage.

Exhibitions 
This is a list of select exhibitions by Val Britton, in order by descending year.

Group shows 
 2010 – Index to Selected Stars, Recology San Francisco Artist-in-Residence Program, San Francisco
 2012 – CES Contemporary, Laguna Beach
 2012 – Here Be Dragons: Mapping Information and Imagination, Intersection for the Arts, San Francisco
 2013 – Intimate Immensity, San Jose Institute of Contemporary Art (ICA), San Jose
 2015 – Frontyard / Backyard, Palo Alto Art Center, Palo Alto
 2015–2016 – Work In Progress: Investigations South of Market at Yerba Buena Center for the Arts, San Francisco
 2016 – Djerassi: A Legacy exhibition, Ascent Private Capital Management, San Francisco

Solo shows 
 2012–2013 – The Continental Interior (Solo Show), San Francisco Arts Commission Gallery, San Francisco
 2013 – Terra incognita (Solo Show), CES Contemporary, Laguna Beach
 2013 – Cosmology (Solo Show), Foley Gallery, New York
 2014 – Passage (Solo Show), Gallery Wendi Norris, San Francisco
 2016 – Transmissions (Solo Show), Gallery Wendi Norris, San Francisco

Permanent collections

 Voyage, located in connecting corridor departures level between domestic Terminals 1 and 2 (in between Virgin and Delta Airlines), San Francisco International Airport
 Achenbach Foundation for Graphic Arts at Legion of Honor (museum)
 New York Public Library
 New-York Historical Society
 Library of Congress
 Alameda County Art Collection
 San Jose Museum of Art

Awards

 2015 – Fleishhacker Foundation, Eureka Fellowship Awardee
 2010 – Pollock-Krasner Foundation Grant

Publications 
 Val Britton / Reverberations (Gallery Wendi Norris, San Francisco), 2016.
 Harmon, Katharine. The Map As Art: Contemporary Artists Explore Cartography (Princeton Architectural Press, New York), 2009.

References

External links
 Val Britton's official website
 Article: "Exhibits of work by Gyorgy Kepes, Val Britton" from SF Chronicle, July 2014
 KQED Arts: "Art that Makes Missing Your Flight OK"
 San Francisco Chronicle: "25 years of turning garbage into art"

Living people
1977 births
Alumni of the Edinburgh College of Art
Rhode Island School of Design alumni
California College of the Arts alumni
American collage artists
Women collage artists
Artists from San Francisco
People from Livingston, New Jersey
Artists from New Jersey
American women artists
21st-century American women